The Philippine Republic, now officially known as the First Philippine Republic, also referred to by historians as the Malolos Republic, was established in Malolos, Bulacan during the Philippine Revolution against the Spanish Empire (1896–1898) and the Spanish–American War between Spain and the United States (1898) through the promulgation of the Malolos Constitution on January 22, 1899, succeeding the Revolutionary Government of the Philippines. It was formally established with Emilio Aguinaldo as president. It maintained governance until April 1, 1901.

Following the American victory at the Battle of Manila Bay, Aguinaldo returned to the Philippines, issued the Philippine Declaration of Independence on June 12, 1898, and established successive revolutionary Philippine governments on June 18 and 23 of that year.

In December 1898, Spain and the United States signed the 1898 Treaty of Paris, ending the Spanish–American war. As part of the treaty, Spain ceded the Philippines to the United States. However, mutual ratification of this treaty would not be exchanged and proclaimed until April 11, 1899, in Washington, D.C., United States. The Malolos Constitution establishing the First Philippine Republic was proclaimed on January 23, 1899. The Philippine–American War began with the first shots being fired by American soldiers on February 4, 1899, which was before the Treaty of Paris was officially effective. The Philippine–American War resulted in American victory, with the U.S. government declaring its end on July 2, 1902.

The First Philippine Republic is sometimes characterized as the first proper constitutional republic in Asia, although there were several Asian republics predating it – for example, the Mahajanapadas of ancient India, the Lanfang Republic, the Republic of Formosa, or the Republic of Ezo, and Aguinaldo himself had led a number of governments prior to Malolos, like those established at Tejeros and Biak-na-Bato which both styled themselves República de Filipinas ("Republic of the Philippines"). Unlike the founding documents of those governments, however, the Malolos Constitution was duly approved by a partially elected congress and called for a true representative democracy.

History
In 1896, the Philippine Revolution began against Spanish colonial rule. In 1897, Philippine forces led by Aguinaldo signed a ceasefire with the Spanish authorities and Aguinaldo and other leaders went into exile in Hong Kong. In April 1898, the Spanish–American War broke out. The U.S. Navy's Asiatic Squadron, then in Hong Kong, sailed to the Philippines to engage the Spanish naval forces. On May 1, 1898, the U.S. Navy decisively defeated the Spanish Navy in the Battle of Manila Bay. Later in May, Aguinaldo returned to the Philippines, established a dictatorial government on May 24, 1898 (formally established by decree on June 18), and on June 12, 1898, at Aguinaldo's ancestral home in Cavite, issued the Philippine Declaration of Independence from Spain. Following the proclamation of independence, Aguinaldo established a revolutionary government on June 23, 1898, under which the partly-elected and partly-appointed Malolos Congress convened on September 15 to write a constitution.

On December 10, 1898, the 1898 Treaty of Paris was signed, ending the Spanish–American War and transferring the Philippines from Spain to the United States.

The Malolos Constitution written by the congress was proclaimed on January 22, 1899, creating what is known today as the First Philippine Republic, with Aguinaldo as its president. The constitution was approved by delegates to the Malolos Congress on January 20, 1899, and sanctioned by Aguinaldo the next day. The convention had earlier elected Aguinaldo president on January 1, 1899, leading to his inauguration on January 23. Parts of the constitution gave Aguinaldo the power to rule by decree.  The constitution was titled "Constitución política", and was written in Spanish.

Philippine–American War

When the First Philippine Republic was constituted on January 22, 1899, in Malolos, that municipality became the seat of government of the Philippine Republic, and was serving as such when hostilities erupted between U.S. and Filipino forces in the Second Battle of Manila on February 4. On February 4, 1899, armed conflict erupted in Manila between Philippine Republic forces and American forces occupying the city subsequent to the conclusion of the Spanish–American War. That day President Aguinaldo issued a proclamation ordering and commanding that "peace and friendly relations with the Americans be broken and that the latter be treated as enemies, within the limits prescribed by the laws of war". The fighting quickly escalated into the Second Battle of Manila, with Philippine Republic forces being driven out of the city.

American forces pushing north from Manila after the outbreak of fighting captured Caloocan on February 10. On March 29, as American forces threatened Malolos, the seat of government moved to San Isidro, Nueva Ecija. On March 31, American forces captured Malolos, the initial seat of the Philippine Republic government, which had been gutted by fires set by withdrawing Philippine Republic forces. Emilio Aguinaldo and the core of the revolutionary government had by then moved to San Isidro, Nueva Ecija. Peace negotiations with the American Schurman Commission during a brief ceasefire in April–May 1899 failed, and San Isidro fell to American forces on May 16. The Philippine Republic core government had moved by then to Bamban, Tarlac, and subsequently moved to Tarlac town. Aguinaldo's party had already left Tarlac, the last capital of the Philippine Republic, by the time American troops occupied it on November13.

American forces captured Calumpit, Bulacan on April 27 and, moving north, captured Apalit, Pampanga with little opposition on May 4 and San Fernando, Pampanga on May 5. This forced the seat of government to be shifted according to the demands of the military situation.

In October 1899, American forces were in San Fernando, Pampanga and the Philippine Republic was headquartered not far north of there, in Angeles City. On October 12, an American offensive to the north forced the Philippine Republic to relocate its headquarters in November to Tarlac, and then to Bayombong, Nueva Vizcaya. On November 13, under pressure by American forces, Aguinaldo and a party departed Bayombong by rail for Calasiao, Pangasinan, from where they immediately proceeded eastwards to Sta. Barbara in order to evade pursuing American forces. In Santa Barbara, they joined a force of some 1200 armed men led by General Gregorio del Pilar.

On November 13, in a conference in Bayambang, Pangasinan, Aguinaldo decided to disperse his army and begin guerrilla war. From that point on, distance and the localistic nature of the fighting prevented him from exercising a strong influence on revolutionary or military operations. Recognizing that American troops blocked his escape east, he turned north and west on November 15, crossing the mountains into La Union province. Aguinaldo's party eluded pursuing American forces, passing through Tirad Pass near Sagada, Mountain Province where the Battle of Tirad Pass was fought on December 2 as a rear guard action to delay the American advance and ensure his escape. At the time of the battle, Aguinaldo and his party were encamped in Cervantes, about 10 km south of the pass. After being notified by a rider of the outcome of the battle and the death of del Pilar, Aguinaldo ordered that camp be broken, and departed with his party for Cayan settlement.

Aguinaldo's party, traveling with del Pilar's force, reached Manaoag, Pangasinan on November 15. There, the force was split into vanguard and rear guard elements, with Aguinaldo and del Pilar in the vanguard. The vanguard force overnighted in Tubao, La Union, departed there on November 16, and was in Naguilian, La Union by November 19, where word was received that American forces had taken Santo Tomas and had proceeded to Aringay. Aguinaldo's force arrived in Balaoan, La Union on November 19, pushed on the next day, and arrived at the Tirad Pass, a natural choke point, on November 23. General del Pilar decided to place a blocking force in Tirad Pass to delay pursuing American forces while Aguinaldo's party moved on.

The Battle of Tirad Pass took place on December 2, 1899. 52 men of del Pilar's 60-man force were killed, including del Pilar himself. However, the Filipinos under del Pilar held off the Americans long enough for Aguinaldo's party to escape. Aguinaldo, encamped with his party about 10 km south of the pass in Cervantes, Ilocos Sur, was apprised of the result of the battle by a rider, and moved on. The party reached Banane settlement on December 7, where Aguinaldo paused to consider plans for the future. On December 16, the party departed for Abra to join forces with General Manuel Tinio. The party traveled on foot through a pass at the summit of Mount Polis, and arrived at Ambayuan the next morning. The party pushed on to Banane, pursued closely by American forces. At this point, Aguinaldo's party consisted of one field officer, 11 line officers, and 107 men. The remainder of December 1899 was spent in continuous trek.

The party was at the border of Abra and Cagayan provinces on Aguinaldo's 31st birthday on March 23, 1900. The trek from place to place continued until about May 22, 1900, when Aguinaldo established a new headquarters in Tierra Virgen. On August 27, 1900, after American forces landed at Aparri, Cagayan, Aguinaldo concluded that Tierra Virgan had become untenable as a headquarters and decided to march to Palanan, Isabela. On December 6, 1900, the party reached Dumasari, and arrived in Palanan the following morning.

Aguinaldo remained in Palanan until his capture there by American forces with the aid of the native scouts on March 23, 1901. Following his capture, Aguinaldo announced allegiance to the United States on April 1, 1901, formally ending the First Republic and recognizing the sovereignty of the United States over the Philippines.

Fighting between the Americans and the remnants of the Philippine Revolutionary Army continued until the surrender of General Miguel Malvar on April 16, 1902.

Organization

Presidency
Executive power was exercised by the President, through his cabinet secretaries. The incumbent president of the Revolutionary Republic initially assumed the presidency. Presidents were to be elected by the legislature to terms of four years and to be eligible for reelection.

In addition to his basic powers, the 1899 Constitution assigned the following duties to the presidency:

Confer civil and military employment in accordance to the law
Appoint Secretaries of Government
Direct diplomatic and commercial relations with other countries
Ensure the swift and complete administration of justice in the entire national territory
Pardon criminal offenders in accordance with the law, subject to the provisions relating to the Secretaries of Government
Preside over national solemnities, and welcome accredited envoys and representatives of foreign countries with relations to the Republic

National cabinet
The constitution established a Council of Government (Cabinet), composed of a President and seven Secretaries. The following individuals were appointed to Cabinet positions:

The following are the executive departments:
Foreign Relations
Interior
Finance
War and the Navy
Public Instruction
Public Works and Communications
Agriculture and Industries Commerce

Legislature
Legislative power was exercised by an Assembly of Representatives initially composed by members of the Revolutionary Government and subsequently elected to four year terms and organized in the form and manner determined by law and referred to at various points in the constitution as the National Assembly. It specified that assembly members would be chosen by election, but left the manner of the election to be later specified by law. The assembly was initially composed of the former members of the Malolos Congress and had powers and responsibilities detailed in Title IV of the constitution.

Provincial and local government
Municipal and provincial governments under the Republic had quickly reorganized upon Aguinaldo's decrees of June 18 and 20, 1898. Article 82 of the Malolos Constitution covered the organization and attributes of provincial and popular assemblies, and specified the principles governing local laws.

Overseas territories
The government claimed jurisdiction over the overseas territory of Palaos (Modern day Palau) and the Sulu archipelago. Both areas are represented in the Congress by representatives appointed by President Emilio Aguinaldo. Aguinaldo sent a letter to the Sultan of Sulu requesting that the islands be part of the First Philippine Republic, but the letter was ignored.

Judiciary
Provisional Law on the Judiciary was issued on March 7, 1899, in accordance to the provisions of the 1899 Malolos Constitution providing that the Chief Justice shall be chosen by the National Assembly with the concurrence of the president and secretaries of the government. Aguinaldo appointed Apolinario Mabini to be the Chief Justice of the Supreme Court of the Philippines on August 23, 1899; however, the appointment did not materialize because of the Philippine–American War.

The Supreme Court included Gracio Gonzaga serving as president; Juan Arceo and Felix Ferrer as Chamber Presidents; and Deogracias Reyes, Juan Tongco, Pablo Tecson, and Ygnacio Villamor serving as Associate Justices

Finances

One of the important laws passed by the Malolos Congress was the law providing for a national loan to buoy up the national budget in which the Republic was trying to balance. The loan, worth 20 million pesos, was to be paid in 40 years with an annual interest of six percent. The law was decreed by Aguinaldo on November 30, 1898.

Military
When Philippine independence was declared on June 12, 1898, the Philippine Revolutionary Army was renamed the Philippine Republican Army. Aguinaldo then appointed Antonio Luna as Director or Assistant Secretary of War by September 28, 1898, and the Philippines first military school, the Academia Militar was established in Malolos.

When the Republic was inaugurated on January 23, Luna had succeeded Artemio Ricarte as the Commanding General of the Republican Army. With such powers at hand, Luna attempted to transform the weak, undisciplined revolutionary army into a disciplined regular army for the service of the Republic.

Seats of government 

Cavite El Viejo – The hometown of General Aguinaldo where the declaration of independence was proclaimed on June 12, 1898.
 Bacoor, Cavite – The declaration of independence was first ratified in Cuenca House by 190 municipal presidents of different towns from 16 provinces.
Malolos, Bulacan – In September 1898, General Emilio Aguinaldo made the Paroquia dela Inmaculada Concepcion, an Augustinian-built town church (now cathedral basilica) of Malolos, the executive palace while the nearby Barasoain Church served as the legislative house where the Malolos Constitution was written. When the Americans captured Malolos, Aguinaldo ordered General Antonio Luna to burn the Malolos Church, including its huge silver altar.
Angeles, Pampanga – On March 17, 1899, General Emilio Aguinaldo transferred the seat of the First Philippine Republic to Angeles. It then became the site of celebrations for the first anniversary of Philippine independence.
San Isidro, Nueva Ecija – On March 29, 1899, Gen. Emilio Aguinaldo arrived in Nueva Ecija and the town was made temporary capital of the First Philippine Republic. He stayed in this house which served as his executive office. When the Americans occupied San Isidro, the Sideco house served as the headquarters of Col. Frederick Funston who would later capture General Aguinaldo in Palanan, Isabela. General Aguinaldo's capture is said to have been planned in this house.
Tarlac – The Casa Real de Tarlac served as headquarters of the revolutionary capital after Nueva Ecija was captured by the Americans in 1899.
Pangasinan – In November 1899, Emilio Aguinaldo designated Bayambang as seat of government after Tarlac was captured by the Americans.
Kalinga – Emilio Aguinaldo made Lubuagan the seat of government for 73 days, from 6 March 1900 to 18 May 1900 before his escape and eventual capture at Palanan, Isabela.
Palanan, Isabela – On March 23, 1901, General Aguinlado was captured by American forces with the aid of the native scouts and eventually detained in a villa near Malacañang Palace.

Image gallery

See also
 History of the Philippines (1898–1946)
 Sovereignty of the Philippines

Notes

References

  (includes original Spanish version)

Sources

 
 .
 
 
 . (published online 2005, University of Michigan Library)
 
 
 
 
 
  (republished by openlibrary.org)
 
 
 The Malolos Republic
 The First Philippine Republic at Malolos
 Project Gutenberg – Panukala sa Pagkakana nang Repúblika nang Pilipinas by Apolinario Mabini

 
First Philippine Republic
Former republics
Former unrecognized countries
First Philippine Republic
First Philippine Republic
States and territories established in 1899
States and territories disestablished in 1901